The 2003–04 Australian Athletics Championships was the 82nd edition of the national championship in outdoor track and field for Australia. It was held from 26–29 February 2004 at the Sydney Olympic Park Athletic Centre in Sydney. It served as a selection meeting for Australia at the 2004 Summer Olympics.

Medal summary

Men

Women

References

External links 
 Athletics Australia website

2004
Australian Athletics Championships
Australian Championships
Athletics Championships
Sports competitions in Sydney
2000s in Sydney